The following are the football (soccer) events of the year 1932 throughout the world.

Winners club national championship
 Argentina: River Plate
 Belgium: Lierse S.K.
 England: Everton F.C.
 France: Olympique Lillois
 Germany: Bayern Munich
 Iceland: KR
 Italy: Juventus
 Mandatory Palestine: British Police
 Netherlands: Ajax Amsterdam
 Poland: Cracovia
 Romania: Venus București
 Scotland:
Division One: Motherwell F.C.
Scottish Cup: Rangers F.C.
 Soviet Union: team of Moscow
 Spain: Real Madrid
 Turkey: İstanbulspor

International tournaments
 1932 British Home Championship (September 19, 1931 – April 9, 1932)

 Balkan Cup 1932 in Yugoslavia (June 26 – July 3, 1932)

 Baltic Cup 1932 in Latvia (August 28–30, 1932)

 1929-32 Nordic Football Championship (June 14, 1929 – September 25, 1932)1932: (June 10 – September 25, 1932)
 (1932)
 (1929–1932)

 II. Dr. Gerö Cup (February 22, 1931 – October 28, 1932)

Births
 January 5: Bill Foulkes, English international footballer and manager (died 2013)
 January 9: Arne Høivik, Norwegian international footballer (died 2017)
 February 27: László Sárosi, Hungarian international footballer (died 2016)
 February 28: Noel Cantwell, Irish international footballer (died 2005)
 April 16: Henk Schouten, Dutch footballer (died 2018)
 May 15: Turgay Şeren, Turkish international footballer (died 2016)
 June 22: Salvador Farfán, Mexican midfielder
 June 25: Valeriu Soare, Romanian forward
 August 11: Giovanni Di Veroli, Italian footballer (died 2018)
 September 11: Peter Anderson, English club footballer (died 2009)
 November 3: Guillaume Bieganski, French international footballer (died 2016)
 November 22: Günter Sawitzki, German international goalkeeper (died 2020)

References

 
Association football by year